Yangshan County (postal: Yeungshan) is a county in the northwest of Guangdong Province, China, bordering Hunan province to the north. It is under the administration of the city of Qingyuan.

A military camp was established in the area in the late Qin dynasty. It was Emperor Han Wu Di who formally recognized Yangshan as a county. A Tang dynasty poet, Han You (Chinese: 韓愈), visited it and wrote a poem about his journey, "The Travel Diary of Swallow Pavilion" (Chinese: < 燕喜亭記>).

In Grand Theft Auto V, according to Trevor Philips, Los Santos Triads leader Wei Cheng and his son Tao Cheng were born in Yangshan.

other information: according to local gazette of Guangdong ( 《 廣東史志> ), yangshan county is hometown of about six thousand overseas chinese, these overseas chinese settle in Malaysia, United States of America, etc.

Climate

References

County-level divisions of Guangdong
Qingyuan